"We Are One Tonight" is a song recorded by the American rock band Switchfoot and is their second single from the album Nothing Is Sound.  This is the eleventh track on the album. Lead singer and songwriter Jon Foreman has said that the song is "about unity."

Music videos
The first music video for this song is a montage from their various live performances on their fall tour, and also includes many fans holding signs that read "We are one". The band stated that this video was "for the fans" not intending for this to become a mainstream video.
A second, official music video was also released near the end of March 2006. In the video, different people from different walks of life are all one and the same in movement and framing. Director Jon Watts shows off his seamless editing touch by making rapid fire cuts between people who are in practically identical positions on screen.
A third music video was filmed on December 15, 2010 by Hurley for ESPN's broadcast of 2011 BCS National Championship Game. The video is slated to feature highlights and cuts from the 2010 college football season interspersed between performance footage of Switchfoot playing the song. According to a report from the Land of Broken Hearts website, keyboardist Jerome Fontamillas added "marching band trumpets" to the mix to keep with the football theme.

Reception
"We Are One Tonight" received significantly less radio play than Switchfoot's previous singles, receiving virtually no play at rock radio and only minimal play on the Pop and Top 40 radio formats. The song did very well on Christian formats however, and was #8 on the Christian Hit Radio year end chart , and #13 on the Christian Rock year end chart. 

Despite the lack of success at radio, the song has been feature prominently in several television advertisements and sports broadcasts over the years since it debuted.

Charts

In the media
The song was featured on the NBC adverts for the Torino 2006 Winter Olympics
The song was used by the Chicago station WGN-TV in a montage chronicling the World Series run by the Chicago White Sox in 2005.
The song was used in the commercials for American Idol season 5
The song was used in a 2008 ONE Campaign commercial.
The song was used in a music video that aired during ESPN's broadcast of the 2011 BCS National Championship Game.

References

External links
Switchfoot
Official Music video

2006 singles
Switchfoot songs
Songs written by Jon Foreman
2005 songs
Songs written by Tim Foreman
Sony BMG singles
Song recordings produced by John Fields (record producer)